Here Comes Everybody may refer to:

 Here Comes Everybody (album), by Spacey Jane, 2022
 Here Comes Everybody (book), by Clay Shirky, 2008
 Here Comes Everybody, a 1925 reprint of the novel Finnegans Wake
 Here Comes Everybody: The Story of the Pogues, a 2012 memoir by James Fearnley